The Dublin Blues are an Irish rugby league team from Dublin, Ireland. The Blues will play in the 2021 Euro XIII's cup competition.

History 
The Dublin Blues are Ireland's first ever rugby league club having been founded in 1989 by Brian Corrigan following a meeting with a delegation from the Rugby Football League which took place in 1988.

Initially the club played touring teams from the United Kingdom as there were no other teams in Ireland for a number of years. However, in 1995 the RFL financed a development programme in Ireland which would lead to the first domestic competition in 1997.

The Blues would become the inaugural champions of Ireland beating Tallaght Tigers in the 1997 Grand Final.  They would go on to compete in the next two grand finals winning one and losing one.

Following their win in 1997 the Blues would become the first ever Irish team to enter into the Challenge Cup where they would be drawn away to Dewsbury Moors and would find themselves at the wrong end of a 32–7 score line.

Another foray into the Challenge Cup followed in 1999 this time the Blues would again come undone in the first round against Farnworth.

The Blues were a dominant force in the late 90's and early 00's in Irish rugby league in total they took part in 6 All Ireland Grand Finals winning 3 and also an Al Ireland Challenge Cup Final in 1998.

While the early 2000s bore fruit for Ireland's oldest team the Blues became weakened towards the end of the decade and in 2008 ceased to exist.

It seemed the once powerhouse of Irish Rugby League who produced Wigan Warriors legend Brian Carney would be resigned to the history books. However, 10 years after they ceased playing a plan was hatched to bring back the Blues.

The initial plan was to seek the funding to enter RFL League 1 and to give Irish players an opportunity to play semi-professional rugby league without the necessity to relocate to another country.

In 2020 the launch of the Euro XIII competition caught the working groups eyes and they successfully enter to participate in the 2021 competition.

Honours
 Irish Elite League (2): 1997 & 1999

References

External links

Irish rugby league teams
Sports clubs in Dublin (city)
Rugby league teams in County Dublin
Rugby clubs established in 1989
1989 establishments in Ireland
Diaspora sports clubs
Australian diaspora in Europe
Euro XIII